Tecate Creek is a stream in northern Baja California, Mexico with its headwaters in southern San Diego County, California in the United States. It begins along the Tecate Divide in the In-Ko-Pah Mountains, near Live Oak Springs. The upper reaches of the stream in the US are known as Campo Creek. It flows southwest, crossing the Mexico–United States border at Canyon City, before flowing through the city of Tecate, Baja California. West of Tecate it flows through a gorge and briefly re-enters the US where it combines with Cottonwood Creek to form the Rio Alamar, a tributary of the Tijuana River which it joins in Central Tijuana.

See also
List of rivers of Mexico

Rivers of Baja California
Rivers of San Diego County, California